Bayqut (Turkish as Bayqut also Romanized as Bāyqūt) is a village in Gavdul-e Gharbi Rural District, in the Central District of Malekan County, East Azerbaijan Province, Iran. At the 2006 census, its population was 3,414, in 792 families.

References 

Populated places in Malekan County